Eicosatetraenoic acid (ETA) designates any straight chain 20:4 fatty acid. Eicosatetraenoic acid belongs to the family of eicosanoids, molecules synthesized from oxidized polyunsaturated fatty acids (PUFAs) to mediate cell-cell communication. The eicosanoids, working in tandem, contribute to a lipid signaling complex widely responsible for inducing an inflammatory immune response. Common signs of inflammation are both internal and external, with effects like visible redness, pain in the surrounding area, swelling, and the sensation of heat—many of these an effect of varying eicosanoid species. These effects are associated with and have been observed in patients with cancers and various neurological/metabolic disorders.

See Essential Fatty Acid for nomenclature.
Two isomers, both of them essential fatty acids, are of particular interest:
 all-cis-5,8,11,14-eicosatetraenoic acid is an ω-6 fatty acid with the trivial name arachidonic acid.  It is formed by a desaturation of dihomo-gamma-linolenic acid (DGLA, 20:3 ω-6).
 all-cis-8,11,14,17-eicosatetraenoic acid is an ω-3 fatty acid. It is an intermediate between stearidonic acid (18:4 ω-3) and eicosapentaenoic acid (EPA, 20:5 ω-3)

Some chemistry sources define 'arachadonic acid' to designate any of the eicosatetraenoic acids.  However, almost all writings in biology, medicine and nutrition limit the use of the term 'arachidonic acid' to all-cis-5,8,11,14-eicosatetraenoic acid (ω-6).

Recent studies 

ETA is found in green-lipped mussel and appears to act as dual inhibitor of arachidonic acid oxygenation by both the cyclooxygenase (COX) and lipoxygenase pathway. According to the journal of nutrition, feeding green-lipped mussel to arthritic dogs leads to an improved response. In addition to their inflammatory nature, eicosanoid molecules such as ETA can also contribute to an anti-inflammatory response. Many ω-3-PUFAs are abundantly produced in nature and can be extracted and studied. These molecules have exhibited anti-inflammatory properties and have led scientists to believe that they may serve as relief to patients with rheumatoid arthritis, asthma, and heart disease, afflictions associated with an overly active inflammatory response. ETA, which is much less abundant in nature, has been the subject of significantly less studies. As a member of the eicosanoid family, it is expected that ETA should have a similar positive effect in the human body however there is a lack in its production and therefore a lack in its scientific investigation and understanding.

Mortierella alpina 1S-4 is a fungus employed in the biological production of arachidonic acid, and so biotechnology has allowed for the biosynthesis of a mutant strain of this fungus. Mortierella alpina typically only produces ETA in trace amounts at low temperatures, making it difficult to isolate and examine. This developed mutant strain is capable of producing larger amounts of ETA due to the expression of an ω-3-desaturase gene, typically responsible for the significant production of the more abundant PUFAs.The development of a mutant strain was considered in the context of the over-expression of the endogenous ω-3-desaturase gene versus the heterologous Saprolegnia diclina Δ17 (sdd17m) desaturase gene. The endogenous ω-3-desaturase gene transformed fungi had ETA at 42.1% in total lipid concentration, 84.2-fold and 3.2-fold more than two wild-type strain fungi when contrasted at a temperature of 12 degrees Celsius. While no ETA accumulation is documented at 28 degrees Celsius, the mutant strain of the fungus transformed with the heterologous sdd17mgene exhibited 24.9% of the total lipid content at the same temperature, indicating success in the genetic alteration and abundance of ETA provided for the study, at a variety of different temperatures and conditions. This allows for a more inclusive analysis of the effects of ETA on the human body and provides new insight for medical treatments to inflammatory conditions, given the newfound methods for producing and collecting these molecules for isolation and analysis. This study provides insight as to how many molecules may have multiple functions, some of which are unknown and are still being determined by scientists. The duality of molecules like eicosatetraenoic acid and other eicosanoids, both as inflammatory and anti-inflammatory molecules, is a point of compelling research.

See also 
Polyunsaturated fatty acid
List of omega-3 fatty acids
Omega-3 fatty acids
Omega-6 fatty acids

References

Fatty acids
Alkenoic acids